is a town located in Sorachi Subprefecture, Hokkaido, Japan.

External links

Official website 

Towns in Hokkaido